Curry's bat (Glauconycteris curryae) is a species of vesper bat in the family Vespertilionidae. It is found in Cameroon and Democratic Republic of the Congo. Its natural habitats are subtropical and tropical moist lowland forests and subtropical and tropical swamps.

The specific name was originally curryi, but it was emended to be curryae in accordance with §31.1.2 of the ICZN Code.

References

Further reading
 

Glauconycteris
Mammals described in 2001
Bats of Africa
Taxonomy articles created by Polbot